A chamfer plane is a specialised plane used In woodworking for making chamfered edges.

Further reading
https://swingleydev.com/woodworking/jigs.php
https://swingleydev.com/woodworking/images/chamfer_plane.pdf

Images
http://www.fine-tools.com/G309803.htm

Planes